This is a partial filmography of Prem Nazir. Prem Nazir is an Indian actor who worked primarily in Malayalam cinema films. Nazir holds two Guinness World Records; for playing the lead role in a record 524 films, and for playing opposite the same heroine in 110 films (with Sheela). He has acted with 80 heroines and 39 films were released in a single year once.

Malayalam
He has acted in about 900 movies.

1950s

1960s

1970s

1980s

Other languages 
Tamil

He has acted in 56 Tamil movies in which 39 movies are released.

Telugu 

Kannada

References

Indian filmographies
Male actor filmographies